Sana Akroud (born November 18, 1980) is a Moroccan actor, filmmaker, screenwriter and film producer.

Biography 
She was born on November 18, 1980, in Taroudant, a city in the Sous region of Morocco. After graduating in 1997 from the Ecole Supérieure Art Dramatique and Animation Culturelle in Rabat.

Akroud then played in cinema, notably in Terminus des anges co-signed by Hicham Lasri, Narjiss Nejjar and Mohamed Mouftakir, and released in 2009. She starred in Ismail Saidi's Ahmed Gassiaux, released the same year, and in Yousry Nasrallah's Egyptian feature film Femmes du Cairo, released in 2012. Akroud also participated in distributions for television series, such as Yassine Fennane's Okba Lik.

See also 
Cinema of Morocco

References

External links 

Allociné

1980 births
21st-century Moroccan actresses
Moroccan screenwriters
Women screenwriters
Moroccan film producers
Living people
Moroccan women film producers
Shilha people